Independent Republican Party may refer to:

Independent Republican Party (Cuba)
Independent Republican (Ireland)
Independent Republicans of France
Independent Republican (United States)
Independent-Republican Party of Minnesota 1975-95 (United States)
Independent Republican Party (Turkey)